Rademacher is a Rhenish family of ancient nobility, that has its roots in the village of Rodemack in Lorraine. They also settled in Middelburg, Netherlands and in the latter also in North Rhine-Westphalia (Aachen), East Prussia (Tilsit), Latvia (Riga) and Hesse (Frankfurt).

History

Ancestry
The genealogical tree of the House of Rademacher leads back to the noble family de Rodemack from the village of Rodemack in Lorraine. The first document alluding the House of Rademacher from 1264 names the Rademacher coat of arms. On July 13, 1549 Charles V. awarded a patent of nobility to the House of Rademacher, only accrediting the already existing state of nobility.

Family tree
The first known locum of the dynasty was Dipoldus de Rodemack, who was born in 904. In the 11th to 12th century the name changed to von Rodemack, von Rodemacker and then von Rademacker. But the actual name von Rademacher was already in use in the 13th century. As a Templar Matthias Ägidius von Rademacher was heavily wounded at the Siege of Acre in 1291 and died in Arwad. In the 16th century Gerlach von Rademacher converted to Protestantism. His grandson Johann von Rademacher had 13 children. The last known  patent of nobility was awarded to Daniel von Rademacher by Joseph II. on July, 27th of 1766. His father Arnold Eberhard von Rademacher served Frederick the Great as a royal prussian "Kriegs- und Domainenrath".

References 

German noble families
Barons of the Holy Roman Empire